Austrostipa stipoides, commonly known as prickly spear-grass or coast spear-grass, is a kind of tussock grass native to the coasts of south-eastern Australia and of New Zealand.  It forms large clumps up to about 80 cm in height with smooth inrolled leaves 70 cm long and 1 mm wide with sharp tips.  It is found on sea cliffs, the edges of beach dunes and salt marshes and tolerates strong winds and sea spray.

References

stipoides
Bunchgrasses of Australasia
Flora of Victoria (Australia)
Flora of New Zealand
Flora of New South Wales
Flora of Tasmania
Plants described in 1853